Jacob and his twelve sons is a series of thirteen paintings by Spanish artist Francisco de Zurbarán.

The series of life-size portraits was painted between 1641 and 1658. Twelve of the thirteen paintings are in Auckland Castle, in Bishop Auckland in County Durham, England, and one is in Grimsthorpe Castle, Lincolnshire.

The series travelled to the Americas for the first time in 2016, to be displayed at the Meadows Museum in Dallas, Texas, from 17 September 2017 until 7 January 2018, and then in New York City at the Frick Collection from 31 January until 22 April 2018.

Paintings
The depiction of Jacob and his sons in epic portraits is unusual for the era. More commonly, artists, including Ribera and Velázquez, included these men in narrative painting of Biblical episodes. According to art historian Jeannine Baticle, a series of Jacob and his sons survives in the possession of the Orden Tercera de San Francisco in Lima, Peru, which she describes as a "fairly close replica" of the Auckland Zurbarán series.  An additional series, "a more distant and awkward imitation" by an imitator, is in the possession of the Academia de Bellas Artes in Puebla, Mexico.

History
It is not known how the paintings reached England, although some speculate that they may have been captured by English pirates while being transported from the painter's studio in Seville to a buyer in a Spanish colony in the Americas.

The series is first recorded in 1722 as part of the estate of one William Chapman.  It was later owned by London banker James Mendez, whose heirs sold twelve of the thirteen to Richard Trevor, Bishop of Durham in 1757. Bishop Trevor, a political liberal and a backer of the Jewish Naturalization Act 1753, acquired the paintings, and redesigned and reconstructed the Long Dining Room at Auckland Castle, as a public statement of his support for Jewish naturalization rights.  Although the Bill was quickly repealed, the paintings remained in the Long Dining Room at Auckland Castle.

The portrait of one of Jacob's sons, Benjamin, was sold separately to the Peregrine Bertie, 3rd Duke of Ancaster and Kesteven; it hangs in Grimsthorpe Castle, Lincolnshire.  Bishop Trevor commissioned Arthur Pond to produce a copy painting of "Benjamin".  It hangs, with Jacob and the other eleven sons, in the Castle's Long Dining Room, which Bishop Trevor rebuilt for the purpose of displaying the pictures.

21st century
In 2001 the Church Commissioners voted to sell the paintings, a decision that was revoked in 2011 following a donation of £15 million by investment manager and philanthropist Jonathan Ruffer; new arrangements placed the paintings, along with the castle, under the Auckland Castle Trust, making them available to the public after centuries during which they hung in a private home where they could be seen only by invited guests or by special arrangement with the Bishop's staff.

Gallery

References

External links

Paintings by Francisco de Zurbarán
Painting series
1640s paintings
1650s paintings
Paintings depicting figures from the Book of Genesis
Paintings depicting Jacob
Paintings depicting Joseph (Genesis)